The William P. Heryford House is a house located in Lakeview, Oregon, that is listed on the National Register of Historic Places.

See also
 Heryford Brothers Building
 National Register of Historic Places listings in Lake County, Oregon

References

1911 establishments in Oregon
Buildings and structures in Lakeview, Oregon
Colonial Revival architecture in Oregon
Houses completed in 1911
Houses in Lake County, Oregon
Houses on the National Register of Historic Places in Oregon
Heryford, William P., House